Simon John Dring (11 January 1945 – 16 July 2021) was a British foreign correspondent, television producer, and presenter. He worked for Reuters, The Daily Telegraph of London, and BBC Television, Radio News, and Current Affairs, covering, over 30 years, major stories and events, including 22 wars and revolutions, around the world. He had a wide range of experience in many areas of television broadcasting development and management, designing and producing global television events.

Early life and education
Dring grew up in Fakenham, Norfolk, England, United Kingdom. He was expelled from boarding school in Woodbridge for midnight swimming in the River Deben. He then studied at King's Lynn Technical College. In 1962, at the age of 17, he left home and hitch-hiked overland across Europe and the Middle East, out to India and South-East Asia.

Career
Dring got his first media job in early 1963, at the age of 18, working as a proofreader and feature writer for the Bangkok World newspaper in Thailand.

In 1964, at the age of 19, Dring was a freelance reporter for the London Daily Mail and The New York Times in Laos, before moving to Vietnam at the end of 1964, where he covered the war for two years for Reuters as their youngest staff correspondent at the time.

His journalistic career continued through the 1970s, 1980s, and 1990s as a staff correspondent for Reuters, The Daily Telegraph, and BBC TV News, as well as a freelance reporter and producer for, among others, The Sunday Times, Newsweek, and BBC Radio News. During this time Dring covered major stories and events throughout Europe, Africa, the Middle East, Asia and Latin America, including Vietnam, Laos, Cambodia, India, Pakistan, Bangladesh, Iran, Nigeria, Angola, Uganda, Eritrea, Cyprus (where he was injured), Israel, Brazil, Croatia, Bosnia, and Georgia.

Sport Aid
In 1986, at the age of 41, Dring produced and helped design and organise (with Founder Chris Long and Sir Bob Geldof) Sport Aid and The Race Against Time, still the biggest simultaneous mass-participation sporting event ever held and, at the time, the most complex live global television event ever produced. It raised over US$36 million for famine relief in Africa. More than 20 million people in 120 countries took part.

On The Road Again
In 1992, at the age of 47, Dring retraced his 1962 overland journey to India for BBC Radio 4 as a series entitled On The Road Again. The series was first broadcast in the summer of 1993 and repeated in 1994.

In 1994, at the age of 49, Dring repeated the journey again for an 8-part TV series of the same name for BBC Television and the Discovery Channel. Dring was accompanied on the six-month journey by Director/Cameraman Ron Orders, Recordist/Cameraman Sean Carswell, Production Manager Dan Laurie (Simon's nephew), and Production Co-ordinator Michelle Smith. They covered  in a Jeep and a Land Rover. Dring wrote a book to accompany the TV series, On The Road Again: Thirty Years On The Traveller's Trail To India (1995), which was published by BBC Books.

Ekushey Television
In 1997, Dring joined with partners in Bangladesh to develop, license, and build Ekushey Television, the first private, commercial terrestrial/satellite TV channel in Bangladesh. As Joint Managing Director of ETV (working with Farhad Mahmud, son of the ETV Chairman, the late A. S. Mahmud), Dring helped create a vision for ETV that was as much about news and education as it was about entertainment. He established what was, in effect, the first television news operation in the country with a team of more than 50 reporters, producers, and editors.

Within two years, ETV, with a staff of nearly 400 people, grew to become the biggest and most successful network in the country, attracting a national audience of more than 40 million, and many more internationally through its satellite transmissions. It was also financially profitable, with an annual turnover of US$12 million, growing at the rate of 30% per annum and creating jobs for more than 5,000 contractors. However, its considerable success was also its downfall and, despite national and international protest, elections in 2002 saw a new government move quickly to shut down ETV by the end of that year.

Jamuna Television
In 2014, he was chief broadcast consultant for the launch and management of Bangladeshi satellite channel Jamuna Television.

Awards, commendations, and nominations
During his career, Dring has received the following Awards, Commendations and Honors:
 UK Reporter of the Year – for his eyewitness accounts in The Daily Telegraph of the massacres in Dhaka at the start of the Bangladesh Liberation War
 UK Television News Reporter of the Year – for his reports for BBC Television News from Eritrea, Zaire, and Iran
 International Reporter of the Year (Monte Carlo Television Festival "Golden Nymph Award" - shared with John Simpson) for his reporting of the Iranian Revolution for BBC Television News
 International Valiant For Truth - for his reporting from behind the lines with the EPLF guerrilla forces in Eritrea for BBC Television News & Current Affairs
 Amnesty International – for his radio documentary for BBC Radio 4 on Turkey's war against the Kurds (the PKK)
 The Sony Radio Awards - for his reporting for BBC Radio 4 of Turkey's War against the Kurds
 The New York Festival Grand Prize - for his BBC Radio 4 documentary on the US Invasion of Haiti

Personal life
Dring lived between Australia, the UK, and Romania with his partner, Fiona McPherson, an Australian human rights lawyer and executive director of a British children's charity in Romania. Their twin daughters were born on 23 December 2010 in Brisbane. Dring has another daughter from a previous marriage who lives in Spain and has two sons (Dring's grandsons).

In July 2021, while undergoing an operation for a hernia in Romania, Dring suffered a heart attack and was not revived, dying at the age of 76.

References

English male journalists
People from Fakenham
1945 births
2021 deaths
Writers from Norfolk
20th-century English male writers
21st-century English male writers